Ewa Minge (born 23 May 1967 in Szczecinek, Poland) is a Polish fashion designer. Dubbed the "Next Couture", her collection has been shown globally, including on the Spanish Steps in Rome. Minge is one of Poland's most well-known fashion designers. Since 1994, her main focus has been on fashion and upmarket industrial design.

In Poland, Eva Minge cooperates with TVP and TVN television channels, creating images of celebrities and contributing to TV productions.

References

External links 
official website (in English, Polish and Italian)
Eva Minge Eyewear

1968 births
Living people
Polish fashion designers
Polish women fashion designers